Muro de Aguas is a small municipality (pop. 61 (2007)) in the southern part of La Rioja, Spain, near Arnedo.

Demography

See also 
 La Rioja (Spain)
 List of municipalities in La Rioja

References

External links

Municipally statistics (in Spanish)

Municipalities in La Rioja (Spain)